"On the Way Down" is the debut single of American musician Ryan Cabrera, released from his 2004 studio album, Take It All Away. Cabrera co-wrote the song with Curtis Frasca and Sabelle Breer and produced it with Goo Goo Dolls frontman John Rzeznik. Released on May 24, 2004, the song peaked at number 15 on the US Billboard Hot 100 on October 5, 2004. The song won a 2006 ASCAP Pop Award for most performed song of the year.

Music video

The music video features Ashlee Simpson, Cabrera's then-girlfriend, playing his love interest. The music video for the single was filmed in Austin, Texas, at the University of Texas at Austin. The video reached number four on the TRL countdown.

Track listings
US enhanced CD single
 "On the Way Down" – 3:32
 "Let's Take Our Time" – 3:09
 "On the Way Down" (video)

Australian CD single
 "On the Way Down" (album version) – 3:32
 "I Know What It Feels Like" – 3:28
 "Exit to Exit" (NapsterLive version) – 4:24

Credits and personnel
Credits are lifted from the US enhanced CD single liner notes and inlay.

Studios
 Recorded at Ocean Way Recording Studio B and John Rzeznik's house (Los Angeles, California, US)
 Mixed at Ocean Way Recording Studio D (Los Angeles, California, US)

Personnel

 Ryan Cabrera – writing, vocals, acoustic guitar, production
 Curtis Frasca – writing
 Sabelle Breer – writing
 Greg Suran – electric guitars
 Paul Bushnell – bass

 Gregg Bissonette – drums, percussion
 John Rzeznik – production
 Doug McKean – engineering, mixing
 Evan Lamberg – executive album production

Charts

Weekly charts

Year-end charts

Certifications

Release history

References

Ryan Cabrera songs
2004 debut singles
2004 songs
Atlantic Records singles
Songs written by Ryan Cabrera
Songs written by Curtis Frasca